Sarita Arya (Hindi: सरिता आर्या) is the sitting and second time elected  M.L.A. (Member of Legislative Assembly (India)) from 58 Legislative Assembly seat of  lake city Nainital in the state of Uttarakhand. She was elected for the first term in the year 2012 from Indian National Congress and held the elected post till 2017. She won her second term from the same constituency in the 2022 state polls contesting from the Bhartiya Janta Party.

By winning the Nainital seat in the year 2012 she set a unique record of being the first woman to win this prestigious seat since independence. Before her, three women candidates contested this seat but could not win. Her then party Indian National Congress bagged this seat after a long gap of 23 years, this seat was either with UKD (Uttarakhand Kranti Dal) or BJP (Bharatiya Janata Party) starting from the year 1989 until she won in the assembly polls of 2012.

In the month of May 2015, she was appointed the Women State President of Indian National Congress for the state of Uttarakhand by Rahul Gandhi, the then Congress Vice President. Before being elected as the member of legislative assembly she held the post of Chairperson Municipal Corporation Nainital, for which she was elected in the year 2003 and her tenure lasted till 2008.

On 17 January 2022 she joined the BJP (Bhartiya Janta Party) and contested the legislative assembly election held in the month of February 2022 from 58 Vidhansabha seat of Nainital.

Currently she also holds the position of District President of AIWC (All India Women's Conference) since 2009. Apart from this she is also an avid social worker and fights for women empowerment and gender equality.

Positions held
 Chairman - Nainital Nagar Palika (2003–08)
 District President - All India Women's Conference (2009-Till Date)
 MLA - Nainital ( 2022-) / Nainital ( 2012-2017 )
 State President Mahila Congress Uttarakhand (2015–22)

Elections Contested

See also 
 2012 Uttarakhand Legislative Assembly election

References 

1961 births
Living people
21st-century Indian politicians
Bharatiya Janata Party politicians from Uttarakhand
Indian National Congress politicians
Uttarakhand MLAs 2022–2027